Apollo 8 (December 21–27, 1968) was the first crewed spacecraft to leave low Earth orbit and the first human spaceflight to reach the Moon. The crew orbited the Moon ten times without landing, and then departed safely back to Earth. These three astronauts—Frank Borman, James Lovell, and William Anders—were the first humans to witness and photograph the far side of the Moon and an Earthrise.

Apollo 8 launched on December 21, 1968, and was the second crewed spaceflight mission flown in the United States Apollo space program after Apollo7, which stayed in Earth orbit. Apollo8 was the third flight and the first crewed launch of the Saturn V rocket, and was the first human spaceflight from the Kennedy Space Center, located adjacent to Cape Kennedy Air Force Station in Florida.

Originally planned as the second crewed Apollo Lunar Module and command module test, to be flown in an elliptical medium Earth orbit in early 1969, the mission profile was changed in August 1968 to a more ambitious command-module-only lunar orbital flight to be flown in December, as the lunar module was not yet ready to make its first flight. Astronaut Jim McDivitt's crew, who were training to fly the first lunar module flight in low Earth orbit, became the crew for the Apollo9 mission, and Borman's crew were moved to the Apollo8 mission. This left Borman's crew with two to three months' less training and preparation time than originally planned, and replaced the planned lunar module training with translunar navigation training.

Apollo 8 took 68 hours to travel the distance to the Moon. The crew orbited the Moon ten times over the course of twenty hours, during which they made a Christmas Eve television broadcast in which they read the first ten verses from the Book of Genesis. At the time, the broadcast was the most watched TV program ever. Apollo8's successful mission paved the way for Apollo 10 and, with Apollo11 in July 1969, the fulfillment of U.S. president John F. Kennedy's goal of landing a man on the Moon before the end of the decade. The Apollo8 astronauts returned to Earth on December 27, 1968, when their spacecraft splashed down in the northern Pacific Ocean. The crew members were named Time magazine's "Men of the Year" for 1968 upon their return. It is the last Apollo mission for which all three crew members are still living.

Background

In the late 1950s and early 1960s, the United States was engaged in the Cold War, a geopolitical rivalry with the Soviet Union. On October 4, 1957, the Soviet Union launched Sputnik 1, the first artificial satellite. This unexpected success stoked fears and imaginations around the world. It not only demonstrated that the Soviet Union had the capability to deliver nuclear weapons over intercontinental distances, it challenged American claims of military, economic, and technological superiority. The launch precipitated the Sputnik crisis and triggered the Space Race.

President John F. Kennedy believed that not only was it in the national interest of the United States to be superior to other nations, but that the perception of American power was at least as important as the actuality. It was therefore intolerable to him for the Soviet Union to be more advanced in the field of space exploration. He was determined that the United States should compete, and sought a challenge that maximized its chances of winning.

The Soviet Union had heavier-lifting carrier rockets, which meant Kennedy needed to choose a goal that was beyond the capacity of the existing generation of rocketry, one where the US and Soviet Union would be starting from a position of equality—something spectacular, even if it could not be justified on military, economic, or scientific grounds. After consulting with his experts and advisors, he chose such a project: to land a man on the Moon and return him to the Earth. This project already had a name: Project Apollo.

An early and crucial decision was the adoption of lunar orbit rendezvous, under which a specialized spacecraft would land on the lunar surface. The Apollo spacecraft therefore had three primary components: a command module (CM) with a cabin for the three astronauts, and the only part that would return to Earth; a service module (SM) to provide the command module with propulsion, electrical power, oxygen, and water; and a two-stage lunar module (LM), which comprised a descent stage for landing on the Moon and an ascent stage to return the astronauts to lunar orbit. This configuration could be launched by the Saturn V rocket that was then under development.

Framework

Prime crew

The initial crew assignment of Frank Borman as Commander, Michael Collins as Command Module Pilot (CMP) and William Anders as Lunar Module Pilot (LMP) for the third crewed Apollo flight was officially announced on November 20, 1967. Collins was replaced by Jim Lovell in July 1968, after suffering a cervical disc herniation that required surgery to repair. This crew was unique among pre-Space Shuttle era missions in that the commander was not the most experienced member of the crew: Lovell had flown twice before, on Gemini VII and Gemini XII. This would also be the first case of a commander of a previous mission (Lovell, Gemini XII) flying as a non-commander. This was also the first mission to reunite crewmates from a previous mission (Lovell and Borman, Gemini VII).

, all three Apollo 8 astronauts remain alive.

Backup crew

The backup crew assignment of Neil Armstrong as Commander, Lovell as CMP, and Buzz Aldrin as LMP for the third crewed Apollo flight was officially announced at the same time as the prime crew. When Lovell was reassigned to the prime crew, Aldrin was moved to CMP, and Fred Haise was brought in as backup LMP. Armstrong would later command Apollo11, with Aldrin as LMP and Collins as CMP. Haise served on the backup crew of Apollo11 as LMP and flew on Apollo13 as LMP.

Support personnel

During Projects Mercury and Gemini, each mission had a prime and a backup crew. For Apollo, a third crew of astronauts was added, known as the support crew. The support crew maintained the flight plan, checklists, and mission ground rules, and ensured that the prime and backup crews were apprised of any changes. The support crew developed procedures in the simulators, especially those for emergency situations, so that the prime and backup crews could practice and master them in their simulator training. For Apollo8, the support crew consisted of Ken Mattingly, Vance Brand, and Gerald Carr.

The capsule communicator (CAPCOM) was an astronaut at the Mission Control Center in Houston, Texas, who was the only person who communicated directly with the flight crew. For Apollo8, the CAPCOMs were Michael Collins, Gerald Carr, Ken Mattingly, Neil Armstrong, Buzz Aldrin, Vance Brand, and Fred Haise.

The mission control teams rotated in three shifts, each led by a flight director. The directors for Apollo8 were Clifford E. Charlesworth (Green team), Glynn Lunney (Black team), and Milton Windler (Maroon team).

Mission insignia and callsign

The triangular shape of the insignia refers to the shape of the Apollo CM. It shows a red figure8 looping around the Earth and Moon to reflect both the mission number and the circumlunar nature of the mission. On the bottom of the8 are the names of the three astronauts. The initial design of the insignia was developed by Jim Lovell, who reportedly sketched it while riding in the back seat of a T-38 flight from California to Houston shortly after learning of Apollo8's re-designation as a lunar-orbital mission.

The crew wanted to name their spacecraft, but NASA did not allow it. The crew would have likely chosen Columbiad, the name of the giant cannon that launches a space vehicle in Jules Verne's 1865 novel From the Earth to the Moon. The Apollo11 CM was named Columbia in part for that reason.

Preparations

Mission schedule

On September 20, 1967, NASA adopted a seven-step plan for Apollo missions, with the final step being a Moon landing. Apollo4 and Apollo6 were "A" missions, tests of the SaturnV launch vehicle using an uncrewed Block I production model of the command and service module (CSM) in Earth orbit. Apollo5 was a "B" mission, a test of the LM in Earth orbit. Apollo7, scheduled for October 1968, would be a "C" mission, a crewed Earth-orbit flight of the CSM. Further missions depended on the readiness of the LM. It had been decided as early as May 1967 that there would be at least four additional missions. Apollo8 was planned as the "D" mission, a test of the LM in a low Earth orbit in December 1968 by James McDivitt, David Scott, and Russell Schweickart, while Borman's crew would fly the "E" mission, a more rigorous LM test in an elliptical medium Earth orbit as Apollo9, in early 1969. The "F" Mission would test the CSM and LM in lunar orbit, and the "G" mission would be the finale, the Moon landing.

Production of the LM fell behind schedule, and when Apollo8's LM-3 arrived at the Kennedy Space Center (KSC) in June 1968, more than a hundred significant defects were discovered, leading Bob Gilruth, the director of the Manned Spacecraft Center (MSC), and others to conclude that there was no prospect of LM-3 being ready to fly in 1968. Indeed, it was possible that delivery would slip to February or March 1969. Following the original seven-step plan would have meant delaying the "D" and subsequent missions, and endangering the program's goal of a lunar landing before the end of 1969. George Low, the Manager of the Apollo Spacecraft Program Office, proposed a solution in August 1968 to keep the program on track despite the LM delay. Since the next CSM (designated as "CSM-103") would be ready three months before LM-3, a CSM-only mission could be flown in December 1968. Instead of repeating the "C" mission flight of Apollo7, this CSM could be sent all the way to the Moon, with the possibility of entering a lunar orbit and returning to Earth. The new mission would also allow NASA to test lunar landing procedures that would otherwise have had to wait until Apollo10, the scheduled "F" mission. This also meant that the medium Earth orbit "E" mission could be dispensed with. The net result was that only the "D" mission had to be delayed, and the plan for lunar landing in mid-1969 could remain on timeline.

On August 9, 1968, Low discussed the idea with Gilruth, Flight Director Chris Kraft, and the Director of Flight Crew Operations, Donald Slayton. They then flew to the Marshall Space Flight Center (MSFC) in Huntsville, Alabama, where they met with KSC Director Kurt Debus, Apollo Program Director Samuel C. Phillips, Rocco Petrone, and Wernher von Braun. Kraft considered the proposal feasible from a flight control standpoint; Debus and Petrone agreed that the next Saturn V, AS-503, could be made ready by December 1; and von Braun was confident the pogo oscillation problems that had afflicted Apollo6 had been fixed. Almost every senior manager at NASA agreed with this new mission, citing confidence in both the hardware and the personnel, along with the potential for a circumlunar flight providing a significant morale boost. The only person who needed some convincing was James E. Webb, the NASA administrator. Backed by the full support of his agency, Webb authorized the mission. Apollo8 was officially changed from a "D" mission to a "C-Prime" lunar-orbit mission.

With the change in mission for Apollo 8, Slayton asked McDivitt if he still wanted to fly it. McDivitt turned it down; his crew had spent a great deal of time preparing to test the LM, and that was what he still wanted to do. Slayton then decided to swap the prime and backup crews of the Dand Emissions. This swap also meant a swap of spacecraft, requiring Borman's crew to use CSM-103, while McDivitt's crew would use CSM-104, since CM-104 could not be made ready by December. David Scott was not happy about giving up CM-103, the testing of which he had closely supervised, for CM-104, although the two were almost identical, and Anders was less than enthusiastic about being an LMP on a flight with no LM. Instead, in order that the spacecraft would have the correct weight and balance, Apollo8 would carry  LM test article, a boilerplate model of LM-3.

Added pressure on the Apollo program to make its 1969 landing goal was provided by the Soviet Union's Zond5 mission, which flew some living creatures, including Russian tortoises, in a cislunar loop around the Moon and returned them to Earth on September 21. There was speculation within NASA and the press that they might be preparing to launch cosmonauts on a similar circumlunar mission before the end of 1968.  Compounding these concerns, American reconnaissance satellites observed a mockup N1 being rolled to the pad at Baikonur in November 1967, with more activity in 1968.

The Apollo 8 crew, now living in the crew quarters at Kennedy Space Center, received a visit from Charles Lindbergh and his wife, Anne Morrow Lindbergh, the night before the launch. They talked about how, before his 1927 flight, Lindbergh had used a piece of string to measure the distance from New York City to Paris on a globe and from that calculated the fuel needed for the flight. The total he had carried was a tenth of the amount that the Saturn V would burn every second. The next day, the Lindberghs watched the launch of Apollo8 from a nearby dune.

Saturn V redesign

The Saturn V rocket used by Apollo8 was designated AS-503, or the "03rd" model of the SaturnV ("5") Rocket to be used in the Apollo-Saturn ("AS") program. When it was erected in the Vehicle Assembly Building on December 20, 1967, it was thought that the rocket would be used for an uncrewed Earth-orbit test flight carrying a boilerplate command and service module. Apollo6 had suffered several major problems during its April 1968 flight, including severe pogo oscillation during its first stage, two second-stage engine failures, and a third stage that failed to reignite in orbit. Without assurances that these problems had been rectified, NASA administrators could not justify risking a crewed mission until additional uncrewed test flights proved the Saturn V was ready.

Teams from the MSFC went to work on the problems. Of primary concern was the pogo oscillation, which would not only hamper engine performance, but could exert significant g-forces on a crew. A task force of contractors, NASA agency representatives, and MSFC researchers concluded that the engines vibrated at a frequency similar to the frequency at which the spacecraft itself vibrated, causing a resonance effect that induced oscillations in the rocket. A system that used helium gas to absorb some of these vibrations was installed.

Of equal importance was the failure of three engines during flight. Researchers quickly determined that a leaking hydrogen fuel line ruptured when exposed to vacuum, causing a loss of fuel pressure in engine two. When an automatic shutoff attempted to close the liquid hydrogen valve and shut down engine two, it had accidentally shut down engine three's liquid oxygen due to a miswired connection. As a result, engine three failed within one second of engine two's shutdown. Further investigation revealed the same problem for the third-stage engine—a faulty igniter line. The team modified the igniter lines and fuel conduits, hoping to avoid similar problems on future launches.

The teams tested their solutions in August 1968 at the MSFC. A Saturn stage IC was equipped with shock-absorbing devices to demonstrate the team's solution to the problem of pogo oscillation, while a Saturn Stage II was retrofitted with modified fuel lines to demonstrate their resistance to leaks and ruptures in vacuum conditions. Once NASA administrators were convinced that the problems had been solved, they gave their approval for a crewed mission using AS-503.

The Apollo 8 spacecraft was placed on top of the rocket on September 21, and the rocket made the slow  journey to the launch pad atop one of NASA's two massive crawler-transporters on October9. Testing continued all through December until the day before launch, including various levels of readiness testing from December5 through 11. Final testing of modifications to address the problems of pogo oscillation, ruptured fuel lines, and bad igniter lines took place on December 18, three days before the scheduled launch.

Mission

Parameter summary

As the first crewed spacecraft to orbit more than one celestial body, Apollo8's profile had two different sets of orbital parameters, separated by a translunar injection maneuver. Apollo lunar missions would begin with a nominal  circular Earth parking orbit.

The standard lunar orbit for Apollo missions was planned as a nominal  circular orbit above the Moon's surface.

Launch and trans-lunar injection

Apollo 8 was launched at 12:51:00 UTC (07:51:00 Eastern Standard Time) on December 21, 1968, using the Saturn V's three stages to achieve Earth orbit. The S-IVB third stage injected the craft into Earth orbit and remained attached to perform the TLI burn that would put the spacecraft on a trajectory to the Moon.

Once the vehicle reached Earth orbit, both the crew and Houston flight controllers spent the next 2hours and 38 minutes checking that the spacecraft was in proper working order and ready for TLI. The proper operation of the S-IVB third stage of the rocket was crucial, and in the last uncrewed test, it had failed to reignite for this burn. Collins was the first CAPCOM on duty, and at 2hours, 27 minutes and 22 seconds after launch he radioed, "Apollo8. You are Go for TLI." This communication meant that Mission Control had given official permission for Apollo8 to go to the Moon. The S-IVB engine ignited on time and performed the TLI burn perfectly.

After the S-IVB had placed the mission on course for the Moon, the command and service modules (CSM), the remaining Apollo8 spacecraft, separated from it. The crew then rotated the spacecraft to take photographs of the spent stage and then practiced flying in formation with it. As the crew rotated the spacecraft, they had their first views of the Earth as they moved away from it—this marked the first time humans had viewed the whole Earth at once. Borman became worried that the S-IVB was staying too close to the CSM and suggested to Mission Control that the crew perform a separation maneuver. Mission Control first suggested pointing the spacecraft towards Earth and using the small reaction control system (RCS) thrusters on the service module (SM) to add  to their velocity away from the Earth, but Borman did not want to lose sight of the S-IVB. After discussion, the crew and Mission Control decided to burn in the Earth direction to increase speed, but at  instead. The time needed to prepare and perform the additional burn put the crew an hour behind their onboard tasks.

Five hours after launch, Mission Control sent a command to the S-IVB to vent its remaining fuel, changing its trajectory. The S-IVB, with the test article attached, posed no further hazard to Apollo8, passing the orbit of the Moon and going into a  solar orbit with an inclination of 23.47° from the Earth's equatorial plane, and an orbital period of 340.80 days. It became a derelict object, and will continue to orbit the Sun for many years, if not retrieved.

Scientists predicted that passing through the belts quickly at the spacecraft's high speed would cause a radiation dosage of no more than a chest X-ray, or 1milligray (mGy; during a year, the average human receives a dose of 2to 3mGy). To record the actual radiation dosages, each crew member wore a Personal Radiation Dosimeter that transmitted data to Earth, as well as three passive film dosimeters that showed the cumulative radiation experienced by the crew. By the end of the mission, the crew members experienced an average radiation dose of 1.6 mGy.

Lunar trajectory

Lovell's main job as Command Module Pilot was as navigator. Although Mission Control normally performed all the actual navigation calculations, it was necessary to have a crew member adept at navigation so that the crew could return to Earth in case communication with Mission Control was lost. Lovell navigated by star sightings using a sextant built into the spacecraft, measuring the angle between a star and the Earth's (or the Moon's) horizon. This task was made difficult by a large cloud of debris around the spacecraft, which made it hard to distinguish the stars.

By seven hours into the mission, the crew was about 1hour and 40 minutes behind flight plan because of the problems in moving away from the S-IVB and Lovell's obscured star sightings. The crew placed the spacecraft into Passive Thermal Control (PTC), also called "barbecue roll", in which the spacecraft rotated about once per hour around its long axis to ensure even heat distribution across the surface of the spacecraft. These temperatures could cause the heat shield to crack and propellant lines to burst. Because it was impossible to get a perfect roll, the spacecraft swept out a cone as it rotated. The crew had to make minor adjustments every half hour as the cone pattern got larger and larger.

The first mid-course correction came eleven hours into the flight. The crew had been awake for more than 16 hours. Before launch, NASA had decided at least one crew member should be awake at all times to deal with problems that might arise. Borman started the first sleep shift but found sleeping difficult because of the constant radio chatter and mechanical noises. Testing on the ground had shown that the service propulsion system (SPS) engine had a small chance of exploding when burned for long periods unless its combustion chamber was "coated" first by burning the engine for a short period. This first correction burn was only 2.4 seconds and added about  velocity prograde (in the direction of travel). This change was less than the planned , because of a bubble of helium in the oxidizer lines, which caused unexpectedly low propellant pressure. The crew had to use the small RCS thrusters to make up the shortfall. Two later planned mid-course corrections were canceled because the Apollo8 trajectory was found to be perfect.

About an hour after starting his sleep shift, Borman obtained permission from ground control to take a Seconal sleeping pill. The pill had little effect. Borman eventually fell asleep, and then awoke feeling ill. He vomited twice and had a bout of diarrhea; this left the spacecraft full of small globules of vomit and feces, which the crew cleaned up as well as they could. Borman initially did not want everyone to know about his medical problems, but Lovell and Anders wanted to inform Mission Control. The crew decided to use the Data Storage Equipment (DSE), which could tape voice recordings and telemetry and dump them to Mission Control at high speed. After recording a description of Borman's illness they asked Mission Control to check the recording, stating that they "would like an evaluation of the voice comments".

The Apollo 8 crew and Mission Control medical personnel held a conference using an unoccupied second-floor control room (there were two identical control rooms in Houston, on the second and third floors, only one of which was used during a mission). The conference participants concluded that there was little to worry about and that Borman's illness was either a 24-hour flu, as Borman thought, or a reaction to the sleeping pill. Researchers now believe that he was suffering from space adaptation syndrome, which affects about a third of astronauts during their first day in space as their vestibular system adapts to weightlessness. Space adaptation syndrome had not occurred on previous spacecraft (Mercury and Gemini), because those astronauts could not move freely in the small cabins of those spacecraft. The increased cabin space in the Apollo command module afforded astronauts greater freedom of movement, contributing to symptoms of space sickness for Borman and, later, astronaut Rusty Schweickart during Apollo9.

The cruise phase was a relatively uneventful part of the flight, except for the crew's checking that the spacecraft was in working order and that they were on course. During this time, NASA scheduled a television broadcast at 31 hours after launch. The Apollo8 crew used a  camera that broadcast in black-and-white only, using a Vidicon tube. The camera had two lenses, a very wide-angle (160°) lens, and a telephoto (9°) lens.

During this first broadcast, the crew gave a tour of the spacecraft and attempted to show how the Earth appeared from space. However, difficulties aiming the narrow-angle lens without the aid of a monitor to show what it was looking at made showing the Earth impossible. Additionally, without proper filters, the Earth image became saturated by any bright source. In the end, all the crew could show the people watching back on Earth was a bright blob. After broadcasting for 17 minutes, the rotation of the spacecraft took the high-gain antenna out of view of the receiving stations on Earth and they ended the transmission with Lovell wishing his mother a happy birthday.

By this time, the crew had completely abandoned the planned sleep shifts. Lovell went to sleep  hours into the flight – three-and-a-half hours before he had planned to. A short while later, Anders also went to sleep after taking a sleeping pill. The crew was unable to see the Moon for much of the outward cruise. Two factors made the Moon almost impossible to see from inside the spacecraft: three of the five windows fogging up due to out-gassed oils from the silicone sealant, and the attitude required for passive thermal control. It was not until the crew had gone behind the Moon that they would be able to see it for the first time.

Apollo 8 made a second television broadcast at 55 hours into the flight. This time, the crew rigged up filters meant for the still cameras so they could acquire images of the Earth through the telephoto lens. Although difficult to aim, as they had to maneuver the entire spacecraft, the crew was able to broadcast back to Earth the first television pictures of the Earth. The crew spent the transmission describing the Earth, what was visible, and the colors they could see. The transmission lasted 23 minutes.

Lunar sphere of influence

At about 55 hours and 40 minutes into the flight, and 13 hours before entering lunar orbit, the crew of Apollo8 became the first humans to enter the gravitational sphere of influence of another celestial body. In other words, the effect of the Moon's gravitational force on Apollo8 became stronger than that of the Earth. This historic moment was of little interest to the crew, since they were still calculating their trajectory with respect to the launch pad at Kennedy Space Center. They would continue to do so until they performed their last mid-course correction, switching to a reference frame based on ideal orientation for the second engine burn they would make in lunar orbit.

The last major event before Lunar Orbit Insertion (LOI) was a second mid-course correction. They would now pass  from the lunar surface.

At 64 hours into the flight, the crew began to prepare for Lunar Orbit Insertion1 (LOI-1). This maneuver had to be performed perfectly, and due to orbital mechanics had to be on the far side of the Moon, out of contact with the Earth. After Mission Control was polled for a "go/no go" decision, the crew was told at 68 hours that they were Go and "riding the best bird we can find". Lovell replied, "We'll see you on the other side", and for the first time in history, humans travelled behind the Moon and out of radio contact with the Earth.

With ten minutes remaining before LOI-1, the crew began one last check of the spacecraft systems and made sure that every switch was in its correct position. At that time, they finally got their first glimpses of the Moon. They had been flying over the unlit side, and it was Lovell who saw the first shafts of sunlight obliquely illuminating the lunar surface. The LOI burn was only two minutes away, so the crew had little time to appreciate the view.

Lunar orbit

The SPS was ignited at 69 hours, 8minutes, and 16 seconds after launch and burned for 4minutes and 7seconds, placing the Apollo8 spacecraft in orbit around the Moon. The crew described the burn as being the longest four minutes of their lives. If the burn had not lasted exactly the correct amount of time, the spacecraft could have ended up in a highly elliptical lunar orbit or even been flung off into space. If it had lasted too long, they could have struck the Moon. After making sure the spacecraft was working, they finally had a chance to look at the Moon, which they would orbit for the next 20 hours.

On Earth, Mission Control continued to wait. If the crew had not burned the engine, or the burn had not lasted the planned length of time, the crew would have appeared early from behind the Moon. Exactly at the calculated moment the signal was received from the spacecraft, indicating it was in a  orbit around the Moon.

After reporting on the status of the spacecraft, Lovell gave the first description of what the lunar surface looked like:

Lovell continued to describe the terrain they were passing over. One of the crew's major tasks was reconnaissance of planned future landing sites on the Moon, especially one in Mare Tranquillitatis that was planned as the Apollo11 landing site. The launch time of Apollo8 had been chosen to give the best lighting conditions for examining the site. A film camera had been set up in one of the spacecraft windows to record one frame per second of the Moon below. Bill Anders spent much of the next 20 hours taking as many photographs as possible of targets of interest.

Throughout the hour that the spacecraft was in contact with Earth, Borman kept asking how the data for the SPS looked. He wanted to make sure that the engine was working and could be used to return early to the Earth if necessary. He also asked that they receive a "go/no go" decision before they passed behind the Moon on each orbit.

As they reappeared for their second pass in front of the Moon, the crew set up equipment to broadcast a view of the lunar surface. Anders described the craters that they were passing over.

Throughout the next two orbits, the crew continued to check the spacecraft and to observe and photograph the Moon. During the third pass, Borman read a small prayer for his church. He had been scheduled to participate in a service at St. Christopher's Episcopal Church near Seabrook, Texas, but due to the Apollo8 flight, he was unable to attend. A fellow parishioner and engineer at Mission Control, Rod Rose, suggested that Borman read the prayer, which could be recorded and then replayed during the service.

Earthrise

When the spacecraft came out from behind the Moon for its fourth pass across the front, the crew witnessed an "Earthrise" in person for the first time in human history. NASA's Lunar Orbiter 1 had taken the first picture of an Earthrise from the vicinity of the Moon, on August 23, 1966. Anders saw the Earth emerging from behind the lunar horizon and called in excitement to the others, taking a black-and-white photograph as he did so. Anders asked Lovell for color film and then took Earthrise, a now famous color photo, later picked by Life magazine as one of its hundred photos of the century.

Due to the synchronous rotation of the Moon about the Earth, Earthrise is not generally visible from the lunar surface. This is because, as seen from any one place on the Moon's surface, Earth remains in approximately the same position in the lunar sky, either above or below the horizon. Earthrise is generally visible only while orbiting the Moon, and at selected surface locations near the Moon's limb, where libration carries the Earth slightly above and below the lunar horizon.

Anders continued to take photographs while Lovell assumed control of the spacecraft so that Borman could rest. Despite the difficulty resting in the cramped and noisy spacecraft, Borman was able to sleep for two orbits, awakening periodically to ask questions about their status. Borman awoke fully when he started to hear his fellow crew members make mistakes. They were beginning to not understand questions and had to ask for the answers to be repeated. Borman realized that everyone was extremely tired from not having a good night's sleep in over three days. He ordered Anders and Lovell to get some sleep and that the rest of the flight plan regarding observing the Moon be scrubbed. Anders initially protested, saying that he was fine, but Borman would not be swayed. Anders finally agreed under the condition that Borman would set up the camera to continue to take automatic pictures of the Moon. Borman also remembered that there was a second television broadcast planned, and with so many people expected to be watching, he wanted the crew to be alert. For the next two orbits, Anders and Lovell slept while Borman sat at the helm.

As they rounded the Moon for the ninth time, the astronauts began the second television transmission. Borman introduced the crew, followed by each man giving his impression of the lunar surface and what it was like to be orbiting the Moon. Borman described it as being "a vast, lonely, forbidding expanse of nothing". Then, after talking about what they were flying over, Anders said that the crew had a message for all those on Earth. Each man on board read a section from the Biblical creation story from the Book of Genesis. Borman finished the broadcast by wishing a Merry Christmas to everyone on Earth. His message appeared to sum up the feelings that all three crewmen had from their vantage point in lunar orbit. Borman said, "And from the crew of Apollo8, we close with good night, good luck, a Merry Christmas and God bless all of you—all of you on the good Earth."

The only task left for the crew at this point was to perform the trans-Earth injection (TEI), which was scheduled for  hours after the end of the television transmission. The TEI was the most critical burn of the flight, as any failure of the SPS to ignite would strand the crew in lunar orbit, with little hope of escape. As with the previous burn, the crew had to perform the maneuver above the far side of the Moon, out of contact with Earth. The burn occurred exactly on time. The spacecraft telemetry was reacquired as it re-emerged from behind the Moon at 89 hours, 28 minutes, and 39 seconds, the exact time calculated. When voice contact was regained, Lovell announced, "Please be informed, there is a Santa Claus", to which Ken Mattingly, the current CAPCOM, replied, "That's affirmative, you are the best ones to know." The spacecraft began its journey back to Earth on December 25, Christmas Day.

Unplanned manual realignment

Later, Lovell used some otherwise idle time to do some navigational sightings, maneuvering the module to view various stars by using the computer keyboard. He accidentally erased some of the computer's memory, which caused the inertial measurement unit (IMU) to contain data indicating that the module was in the same relative orientation it had been in before lift-off; the IMU then fired the thrusters to "correct" the module's attitude.

Once the crew realized why the computer had changed the module's attitude, they realized that they would have to reenter data to tell the computer the module's actual orientation. It took Lovell ten minutes to figure out the right numbers, using the thrusters to get the stars Rigel and Sirius aligned, and another 15 minutes to enter the corrected data into the computer. Sixteen months later, during the Apollo13 mission, Lovell would have to perform a similar manual realignment under more critical conditions after the module's IMU had to be turned off to conserve energy.

Cruise back to Earth and reentry

The cruise back to Earth was mostly a time for the crew to relax and monitor the spacecraft. As long as the trajectory specialists had calculated everything correctly, the spacecraft would reenter Earth's atmosphere two-and-a-half days after TEI and splash down in the Pacific.

On Christmas afternoon, the crew made their fifth television broadcast. This time, they gave a tour of the spacecraft, showing how an astronaut lived in space. When they finished broadcasting, they found a small present from Slayton in the food locker: a real turkey dinner with stuffing, in the same kind of pack given to the troops in Vietnam.

Another Slayton surprise was a gift of three miniature bottles of brandy, which Borman ordered the crew to leave alone until after they landed. They remained unopened, even years after the flight. There were also small presents to the crew from their wives. The next day, at about 124 hours into the mission, the sixth and final TV transmission showed the mission's best video images of the Earth, during a four-minute broadcast. After two uneventful days, the crew prepared for reentry. The computer would control the reentry, and all the crew had to do was put the spacecraft in the correct attitude, with the blunt end forward. In the event of computer failure, Borman was ready to take over.

Separation from the service module prepared the command module for reentry by exposing the heat shield and shedding unneeded mass. The service module would burn up in the atmosphere as planned. Six minutes before they hit the top of the atmosphere, the crew saw the Moon rising above the Earth's horizon, just as had been calculated by the trajectory specialists. As the module hit the thin outer atmosphere, the crew noticed that it was becoming hazy outside as glowing plasma formed around the spacecraft. With the computer controlling the descent by changing the attitude of the spacecraft, Apollo8 rose briefly like a skipping stone before descending to the ocean.

When the spacecraft hit the water, the parachutes dragged it over and left it upside down, in what was termed Stable2 position. As they were buffeted by a  swell, Borman was sick, waiting for the three flotation balloons to right the spacecraft. About six minutes after splashdown, the command module was righted into a normal apex-up (Stable 1) orientation by its inflatable bag uprighting system. The first frogman from aircraft carrier  arrived 43 minutes after splashdown. Forty-five minutes later, the crew was safe on the flight deck of the Yorktown.

Legacy

Historical importance

Apollo 8 came at the end of 1968, a year that had seen much upheaval in the United States and most of the world. Even though the year saw political assassinations, political unrest in the streets of Europe and America, and the Prague Spring, Time magazine chose the crew of Apollo8 as its Men of the Year for 1968, recognizing them as the people who most influenced events in the preceding year. They had been the first people ever to leave the gravitational influence of the Earth and orbit another celestial body. They had survived a mission that even the crew themselves had rated as having only a fifty-fifty chance of fully succeeding. The effect of Apollo8 was summed up in a telegram from a stranger, received by Borman after the mission, that stated simply, "Thank you Apollo8. You saved 1968."

One of the most famous aspects of the flight was the Earthrise picture that the crew took as they came around for their fourth orbit of the Moon. This was the first time that humans had taken such a picture while actually behind the camera, and it has been credited as one of the inspirations of the first Earth Day in 1970. It was selected as the first of Life magazine's 100 Photographs That Changed the World.

Apollo 11 astronaut Michael Collins said, "Eight's momentous historic significance was foremost"; while space historian Robert K. Poole saw Apollo8 as the most historically significant of all the Apollo missions. The mission was the most widely covered by the media since the first American orbital flight, Mercury-Atlas 6 by John Glenn, in 1962. There were 1,200 journalists covering the mission, with the BBC's coverage broadcast in 54 countries in 15 different languages. The Soviet newspaper Pravda featured a quote from Boris Nikolaevich Petrov, Chairman of the Soviet Interkosmos program, who described the flight as an "outstanding achievement of American space sciences and technology". It is estimated that a quarter of the people alive at the time saw—either live or delayed—the Christmas Eve transmission during the ninth orbit of the Moon. The Apollo8 broadcasts won an Emmy Award, the highest honor given by the Academy of Television Arts & Sciences.

Madalyn Murray O'Hair, an atheist, later caused controversy by bringing a lawsuit against NASA over the reading from Genesis. O'Hair wanted the courts to ban American astronauts—who were all government employees—from public prayer in space. Though the case was rejected by the Supreme Court of the United States, apparently for lack of jurisdiction in outer space, it caused NASA to be skittish about the issue of religion throughout the rest of the Apollo program. Buzz Aldrin, on Apollo11, self-communicated Presbyterian Communion on the surface of the Moon after landing; he refrained from mentioning this publicly for several years and referred to it only obliquely at the time.

In 1969, the United States Post Office Department issued a postage stamp (Scott catalogue #1371) commemorating the Apollo8 flight around the Moon. The stamp featured a detail of the famous photograph of the Earthrise over the Moon taken by Anders on Christmas Eve, and the words, "In the beginning God...", the first words of the book of Genesis. In January 1969, just 18 days after the crew's return to Earth, they appeared in the Super Bowl III pre-game show, reciting the Pledge of Allegiance, before the national anthem was performed by trumpeter Lloyd Geisler of the Washington National Symphony Orchestra.

Spacecraft location

In January 1970, the spacecraft was delivered to Osaka, Japan, for display in the U.S. pavilion at Expo '70. It is now displayed at the Chicago Museum of Science and Industry, along with a collection of personal items from the flight donated by Lovell and the space suit worn by Frank Borman. Jim Lovell's Apollo8 space suit is on public display in the Visitor Center at NASA's Glenn Research Center. Bill Anders's space suit is on display at the Science Museum in London, United Kingdom.

In popular culture

Apollo 8's historic mission has been depicted and referred to in several forms, both documentary and fiction. The various television transmissions and 16 mm footage shot by the crew of Apollo8 were compiled and released by NASA in the 1969 documentary Debrief: Apollo8, hosted by Burgess Meredith. In addition, Spacecraft Films released, in 2003, a three-disc DVD set containing all of NASA's TV and 16 mm film footage related to the mission, including all TV transmissions from space, training and launch footage, and motion pictures taken in flight. Other documentaries include "Race to the Moon" (2005) as part of season 18 of American Experience and In the Shadow of the Moon (2007). Apollo's Daring Mission aired on PBS' Nova in December 2018, marking the flight's 50th anniversary.

Apollo 8 serves as character development in the 1995 film Apollo 13, in which Jim Lovell is motivated to walk on the Moon by his Apollo 8 experience and later disappointed to be so near the surface twice without walking on it.

Parts of the mission are dramatized in the 1998 miniseries From the Earth to the Moon episode "1968". The S-IVB stage of Apollo8 was also portrayed as the location of an alien device in the 1970 UFO episode "Conflict". Apollo8's lunar orbit insertion was chronicled with actual recordings in the song "The Other Side", on the 2015 album The Race for Space, by the band Public Service Broadcasting.

In the credits of the animated film Free Birds (2013) a newspaper front page about the Apollo 8 mission is doctored to read: "As one of the most turbulent, tragic years in American history drew to a close, millions around the world were watching and listening as the Apollo 8 astronauts – Frank Gobbler, Jim Snood, and Bill Wattles – became the first turkeys to orbit another world."

A documentary film, First to the Moon: The Journey of Apollo 8 was released in 2018.

The choral music piece Earthrise by Luke Byrne commemorates the mission. The piece was premièred on January 19, 2020, by Sydney Philharmonia Choirs at the Sydney Opera House.

Notes

References

Bibliography

External links

 "Apollo 8" at Encyclopedia Astronautica
  Article about the 40th anniversary of Apollo8

Multimedia
 Apollo 8: Go for TLI 1969 NASA film at the Internet Archive
 Debrief: Apollo 8 1969 NASA film at the Internet Archive
 "Apollo 07 and 08 16mm Onboard Film (1968)" raw footage taken from Apollos 7and8 at the Internet Archive
 Apollo 8 Around the Moon and Back 2018 YouTube video

 
Apollo 08
Crewed missions to the Moon
Spacecraft launched in 1968
1968 in the United States
Spacecraft which reentered in 1968
December 1968 events
Spacecraft launched by Saturn rockets
Jim Lovell
William Anders
Frank Borman